Erik Kendall Hamren (born August 21, 1986) is an American former professional baseball pitcher. He played in Major League Baseball (MLB) for the San Diego Padres.

Baseball career

Amateur career
Hamren went to Tesoro High School as an outfielder and batted .452 his senior year. He lettered in both baseball and football. He was not pursued by any team out of high school, and went to college at University of the Pacific in Stockton, CA, to play for head coach Ed Sprague, a former MLB player. He played in only six games his freshman year, 2006, as an outfielder for the Tigers. In 2007, Hamren also made 10 pitching appearances for Pacific, posting a 13.94 ERA in 10.1 innings with 7 strikeouts. He transferred to Saddleback College for the 2008 season and was drafted by the Chicago Cubs in the 37th round, 1121st overall, of the 2008 MLB Draft.

Professional career
He was drafted as a pitcher and was assigned to the Rookie level Arizona League Cubs, where he went 1-1 with a 5.87 ERA almost exclusively as a reliever. He was promoted to Short-Season Boise. He started 2009 with Single-A Peoria, and finished with a 5.98 ERA over 38 appearances. He was released by the Cubs in the offseason. He spent 2010 in the independent Northern League, in what proved to be the league's last season. He split time with Kansas City and Joliet. He had a 3.39 ERA in the league before being signed in the offseason by the San Diego Padres. He started with A-Advanced Lake Elsinore, and went 2-0 with a 1.08 ERA before earning a promotion to Double-A San Antonio, where he went 3-0 with a 0.92 ERA and was a Texas League All-Star.

On July 31, 2011, Hamren was promoted to the major leagues to replace Mike Adams, who was traded to the Texas Rangers.

On March 27, 2013, Hamren was released by the Padres.

In April 2013, Hamren signed with the Atlanta Braves to a minor league deal, he was assigned to Double-A. On June 2, he was traded to the Tampa Bay Rays for future considerations.

In 2014, Hamren played for the Southern Maryland Blue Crabs. On July 11, the Texas Rangers signed him to a minor league deal.

References

External links

Pacific Tigers Player Bio

1986 births
Living people
Sportspeople from Orange County, California
People from Coto de Caza, California
Baseball players from California
Major League Baseball pitchers
San Diego Padres players
Saddleback Gauchos baseball players
Pacific Tigers baseball players
Arizona League Cubs players
Boise Hawks players
Peoria Chiefs players
Kansas City T-Bones players
Joliet JackHammers players
Lake Elsinore Storm players
San Antonio Missions players
Tucson Padres players
Mississippi Braves players
Southern Maryland Blue Crabs players
Frisco RoughRiders players
Navegantes del Magallanes players
American expatriate baseball players in Venezuela
Mankato MoonDogs players